Kazem Panjavi (born 5 September 1966) is an Iranian weightlifter. He competed in the men's lightweight event at the 1992 Summer Olympics.

References

1966 births
Living people
Iranian male weightlifters
Olympic weightlifters of Iran
Weightlifters at the 1992 Summer Olympics
20th-century Iranian people